is a railway station on the Sanyo Main Line in Higashihiroshima, Hiroshima Prefecture, Japan, operated by West Japan Railway Company (JR West). The station opened on 4 March 2017.

Lines
Jike Station is served by the Sanyō Main Line.

Layout
The station has two side platforms serving two tracks at ground level. The station building is situated above the platforms and tracks.

Platforms

History

The name of the new station was officially announced by JR West in July 2016. The station opened on 4 March 2017. The construction costs of approximately 2.1 billion yen were borne entirely by the city of Higashihiroshima.

Passenger statistics
The station is expected to be used by an average of approximately 2,800 passengers daily.

Surrounding area
  National Route 486
 Hiroshima Prefectural Kamo High School
 Chuo Junior High School
 Saijo Junior High School
 Hiraiwa Elementary School
 Teranishi Elementary School

See also
 List of railway stations in Japan

References

External links

Railway stations in Hiroshima Prefecture
Sanyō Main Line
Stations of West Japan Railway Company
Railway stations in Japan opened in 2017